Another Part of the Forest is a 1948 American drama film directed by Michael Gordon and starring Fredric March. The screenplay by Vladimir Pozner is based on the 1946 play of the same name by Lillian Hellman, which was a prequel to her 1939 drama The Little Foxes.

Plot
Set in the fictional town of Bowden, Alabama, in June 1880, the story focuses on the wealthy, ruthless, and innately evil Hubbard family and their rise to prominence. Patriarch Marcus Hubbard was born into poverty and toiled at menial labor while teaching himself Greek philosophy and the basics of business acumen. He made his fortune by exploiting his fellow Southerners during the American Civil War.

Shrewd, amoral elder son Benjamin is plotting to usurp his father's power and steal his money by revealing his past unscrupulous profiteering. Younger son Oscar, a Klan member, lusts for dancer Laurette Sincee. Regina is the Hubbards' sexually promiscuous daughter. She desires a life in Chicago with former Confederate officer John Bagtry. His sister, Birdie Bagtry, desperately seeks a loan on her family's valuable land, a situation Benjamin hopes to exploit in order to wrest control of the estate from his father.

In the end, when all his offspring turn on Marcus in one way or another, their mother Lavinia leaves her family for the Piney Woods. She is the only one in the household with a sense of morality.

Cast
Fredric March as Marcus Hubbard
Florence Eldridge as Lavinia Hubbard
Dan Duryea as Oscar Hubbard
Edmond O'Brien as Benjamin "Ben" Hubbard
Ann Blyth as Regina Hubbard
John Dall as John Bagtry
Betsy Blair as Birdie Bagtry
Dona Drake as Laurette Sincee
Fritz Leiber as Colonel Isham
Whit Bissell as Jugger
Don Beddoe as Penniman
Wilton Graff as Sam Taylor
Virginia Farmer as Clara Bagtry
Libby Taylor as Coralee
Smoki Whitfield as Jake 
Rex Lease as Josh (uncredited)

Critical reception
Thomas M. Pryor of The New York Times called the film "a compelling entertainment" and added "Vladimir Pozner has preserved the spirit of the play in his screen treatment and Michael Gordon's direction gives a fluency to scenes which might easily have become static due to the profuseness of the dialogue."

Time stated "Under Michael Gordon's direction it is a nearly perfect example of how to film a play. There is hardly a shot which does not set up visual tension against the lashing, steel-spring dialogue; there is not a single performance which is short of adequate; the work of Miss Eldridge, Mr. O'Brien and Betsey Blair, as a shaky-minded neighbor, is much more."

TV Guide stated "This utterly depressing film is salvaged through intense performances that rivet the viewer, along with the literate, acerbic script."

Awards and nominations
Screenwriter Vladimir Pozner was nominated for two Writers Guild of America Awards, for Best Written American Drama and the Robert Meltzer Award for the Screenplay Dealing Most Ably with Problems of the American Scene.

References

External links

 Another Part of the Forest on TCM

1948 films
1948 drama films
American drama films
American films based on plays
Films set in Alabama
Films set in 1880
Films about the Ku Klux Klan
American black-and-white films
Films based on works by Lillian Hellman
Films directed by Michael Gordon
Universal Pictures films
Films scored by Daniele Amfitheatrof
1940s American films
1940s English-language films